After 18 June 1815 numerous British ships have been named Waterloo for the British victory at the Battle of Waterloo:

 was a  merchant ship built at Bristol, England in 1815. On her first voyage she suffered a short-lived mutiny. She then made one voyage under charter to the British East India Company (EIC). She made four voyages transporting convicts from England to Australia, and two voyages from Ireland to Australia. On her seventh convict voyage Waterloo wrecked on 28 August 1842 in Table Bay with great loss of life.
 was launched at Bideford, originally as a West Indiaman. Between 1817 and 1821 she made three voyages to India. She then returned to the West Indies trade. Her crew abandoned her at sea in 1829.
, launched at St. Martins, New Brunswick. She was last listed in 1848.
 was launched at Plymouth. She made two voyages to India. Heavy seas in October 1820 so damaged her that her crew had to abandon her in the North Atlantic.
, launched at Sunderland, was wrecked in October 1821 at Fishhook Bay, Cape of Good Hope.
, was launched at Yarmouth. She sailed first as a West Indiaman. After a mishap in 1822 she was returned to service and traded with the Mediterranean and South America. She was briefly a coaster sailing out of Lynn until she foundered in August 1833.
, was launched at London and made nine voyages for the EIC before she was broken up in 1834.

See also
 – one of two vessels of the Royal Navy 

Ship names